The 2019 Tunis Open was a professional tennis tournament played on clay courts. It was the eleventh edition of the tournament which was part of the 2019 ATP Challenger Tour. It took place in Tunis, Tunisia between 15 and 21 April 2019.

Singles main-draw entrants

Seeds

 1 Rankings are as of 8 April 2019.

Other entrants
The following players received wildcards into the singles main draw:
  Pablo Cuevas
  Aziz Dougaz
  Moez Echargui
  Guillermo García López
  Tseng Chun-hsin

The following player received entry into the singles main draw as an alternate:
  Antoine Escoffier

The following players received entry into the singles main draw using their ITF World Tennis Ranking:
  Riccardo Bonadio
  Skander Mansouri
  Ivan Nedelko
  David Pérez Sanz
  Oriol Roca Batalla

The following players received entry from the qualifying draw:
  Andrea Vavassori
  David Vega Hernández

Champions

Singles

 Pablo Cuevas def.  João Domingues 7–5, 6–4.

Doubles

 Ruben Bemelmans /  Tim Pütz def.  Facundo Argüello /  Guillermo Durán 6–3, 6–1.

References

2019 ATP Challenger Tour
2019
2019 in Tunisian sport
April 2019 sports events in Africa